The Rivière Noire (English: Black River) is a tributary of the rivière de l'Esturgeon, flowing on the south bank of the Saint Lawrence river, in the administrative region of Montérégie, in the province of Quebec, in Canada. This river flows through the following municipalities:
 Saint-Rémi, in the MRC Les Jardins-de-Napierville Regional County Municipality;
 Saint-Isidore in the MRC of Roussillon Regional County Municipality.

The valley of this river is served by the chemin du rang Saint-Régis.

The surface of the Black River (except the rapids areas) is generally frozen from mid-December to the end of March; however, safe circulation on the ice is generally done from the end of December to the beginning of March. The water level of the river varies with the seasons and the precipitation; the spring flood occurs in March or April.

Geography 
The Black River has its source in an agricultural area next to the chemin du rang Sainte-Thérèse.

The course of the Black River passes under the bridge of Chemin Saint-Régis (route 207)

From its mouth, the current follows on  the course of the rivière de l'Esturgeon, on  the course of the Châteauguay River, which flows onto the south bank of the Saint Lawrence River.

Toponymy 
The toponym "Rivière Noire" was formalized on August 17, 1978 at the Commission de toponymie du Québec.

Notes and references

Appendices

Related articles 
 Les Jardins-de-Napierville Regional County Municipality
 Roussillon Regional County Municipality
 Saint-Isidore, a municipality
 Saint-Rémi, a municipality
 Châteauguay River
 Rivière de l'Esturgeon
 St. Lawrence River
 List of rivers of Quebec

External links 

Rivers of Montérégie
Roussillon Regional County Municipality